Chlorodimethylsilane, also called dimethylchlorosilane and abbreviated DMCS, is a chemical compound with the formula (CH3)2SiHCl.  It is a silane, with a silicon atom bonded to two methyl groups, a chlorine atom, and a hydrogen atom.

Its structure, including bond lengths and bond angles, has been determined using Fourier transform microwave spectroscopy.

References

Chlorosilanes